Uno Berg (20 February 1909 – 29 June 2001) was a Swedish sports shooter. He competed at the 1948 Summer Olympics and 1952 Summer Olympics.

References

External links
 

1909 births
2001 deaths
Swedish male sport shooters
Olympic shooters of Sweden
Shooters at the 1948 Summer Olympics
Shooters at the 1952 Summer Olympics
Sportspeople from Dalarna County